The Eternal Evil of Asia is a 1995 Hong Kong Category III comedy horror film written and directed by Man Kei Chin. The film follows a group of friends, who on a hedonistic trip to Thailand, accidentally kill a sorcerer's sister, and upon arriving back home to Hong Kong, find themselves cursed.

External links

1995 films
1990s Cantonese-language films
Hong Kong comedy horror films
Hong Kong fantasy films
1990s comedy horror films
1995 horror films
1995 fantasy films
1990s exploitation films
Sexploitation films
Supernatural comedy films
Hong Kong supernatural horror films
Hong Kong splatter films
1995 comedy films
1990s Hong Kong films